Kiratpur Raja Ram is a village in Vaishali district of Bihar, India. It is located in the Bhagwanpur block.

According to the 2011 Census of India, the village has 2020 households with a total population of 10,891. This includes 5717 males and 5174 females. The effective literacy rate (literacy rate excluding children aged 6 years and below) is 58.41%.

The Vishun Roy College is located in this village. Owned by a political leader Rajdeo Roy and his two sons Jitendra Kumar and Amit Kumar,the college was once known for producing state-level exam toppers. However, in 2016, it was de-recognized by the Bihar School Examination Board (BSEB) for irregularities.

References 

Villages in Vaishali district